Marykkundoru Kunjaadu is a 2010 Malayalam-language comedy film directed by Shafi, starring Dileep, Biju Menon and Bhavana with Vijayaraghavan, Vinaya Prasad, Jagathy Sreekumar and Innocent in supporting roles. The film was released on 25 December 2010 and received highly positive reviewswhich went on to become a Blockbuster completing 150 days and eventually became the second highest grossing Malayalam film of 2010 after Kaaryasthan

The movie was remade by Priyadarshan in Hindi in 2012 as Kamaal Dhamaal Malamaal.

Plot
The story takes place in a remote village in the Kerala Highranges. Solomon, the son of the village sexton, Geevarghese , a simple soul who is quiet in nature and fears virtually everything around, thus earning the nickname Kunjaadu (little lamb). His mother, Mary, was Ittichan's crush. He named his daughter Mary after Solomon's mother.  He wanted Solomon to love his daughter dearly and then he would marry her to some other person so that he gets to know the pain that he felt when he lost his love. He promises the church that he will give another cross made out of gold to the church if Solomon marries some other girl but if he wants to marry his daughter then Solomon must give a cross to church. Mary has been in love with Solomon right from their childhood days. Meanwhile, a man, who looks like a thug, comes to Solomon's house and Solomon, who is overjoyed at getting some fearless company, gets the man accepted by his whole family under the illusion that he is his long-lost brother Jose. He does so much for the family and gets involved in agriculture and develops the family's living. Later, Solomon finds that there is more to his so called brother than he thought initially, and that he killed a girl and was imprisoned for seven years. Finally he finds out that Jose has stolen the cross and hid it in Solomon's land seven years ago and has returned to retrieve it. Solomon warns his family that even if he is their brother, they should be alert or else he'll burn down the house. His parents don't take it seriously but later when the family is away, Jose burns the house down and everyone thinks it is Solomon who did it. Solomon later finds out that Jose's old friend, who also wants the golden cross, was the one who killed the girl, who was actually Jose's lover. A fight occurs between Solomon and both the thieves. Jose's friend gets beaten up and rings the church bell telling that he got the cross and saves Jose by telling that he was the one who help him capture the thief, and because Solomon always considered him as a brother. Everyone is happy and Ittichan gives his daughter's hand to Solomon.

Cast

Soundtrack

The soundtrack of the film was released on 20 December 2010. It had music scored by composers Berny-Ignatius". Lyrics were provided by Anil Panachooran. There was no special launch for the audio release and the music were given straight through the audio sellers.

Release
The film was released on 25 December 2010.

Critical reception
The Rediff critic rated the film 3 stars out of 5. Leading actor Dileep's and Biju Menon's performance was praised, and the credit was to be equally shared by the writer-director team. The film works well.

Box office
The film went on to become commercial success, which completed 150 days in theatres and eventually became the second highest grossing Malayalam film of 2010 behind Pokkiri Raja.

References

External links 
 

2010s Malayalam-language films
2010 romantic comedy films
2010 films
Malayalam films remade in other languages
Films scored by Berny–Ignatius
Films directed by Shafi
Indian romantic comedy films